Face is the debut album of Of Cabbages and Kings, released by Purge/Sound League in 1988.

Track listing

Personnel 
Adapted from the Face liner notes.

Of Cabbages and Kings
 Algis Kizys – bass guitar, vocals (B1, B3, B4), production, design
 Carolyn Master – guitar, vocals (B1, B3, B4), production, design
 Ted Parsons – drums, vocals (B4), production
 Diane Wlezien – vocals (A1-A3, B1, B2, B4)
Additional musicians
 Laurence Olivier – spoken word (A3)
 Miriam Sussman – piano (A2), violin (B2)
 Robert Troch – accordion (A1, B4)

Technical personnel
 Chris Gehringer – mastering
 Kramer – engineering (A2)
 Wharton Tiers – production, engineering
 Daryl Trivieri – illustrations

Release history

References 

1988 debut albums
Of Cabbages and Kings albums
Albums produced by Wharton Tiers